Latin kings, Latin Kings, or The Latin Kings may refer to:
Kings of Alba Longa, a series of legendary kings of Alba Longa, an ancient city in Latium, or their predecessors
Latin Kings (gang), a street gang
The Latin Kings (hip hop group), a Swedish hip hop group
The Original Latin Kings of Comedy